The England national cricket team toured Pakistan in March 1973 and played a three-match Test series against the Pakistan national cricket team which was drawn 0–0. England were captained by Tony Lewis and Pakistan by Majid Khan.

Test series summary

First Test

Second Test

Third Test

References

External links

1973 in English cricket
1973 in Pakistani cricket
1973
International cricket competitions from 1970–71 to 1975
Pakistani cricket seasons from 1970–71 to 1999–2000